Cannabis advertising is the advertising of cannabis products to consumers by the cannabis industry through a variety of media. It is  regulated by U.S. states. Some or all forms of cannabis advertising are banned in many countries.

Severely limiting advertising is considered part of a "grudging toleration" approach to cannabis.

Beckley Foundation created New Draft Framework Convention on Cannabis Control in 2010 with Comprehensive ban proposal

California specifically prohibits false health claims in advertising.

A form of cross-promotion for cannabis and fast food was used in three California Jack in the Box locations in conjunction with the January 1, 2018 cannabis legalization under Proposition 64.

Mail delivery of print advertising for cannabis is prohibited by U.S. Federal regulations and laws, and traditional print media may face "fear of driving away other advertisers", creating an advertising market in local alternative newsweeklies.

Canada's national cannabis legalization will impose strict rules on advertising "similar to those governing the sale of cigarettes".

Anti-cannabis advertising
Anti-cannabis advertising campaigns, usually run as public service announcements, have included the Stoner Sloth campaign in Australia, DrugsNot4Me in Canada, and several campaigns created by Partnership for a Drug-Free America including the "pot surgeon" PSA from the 1990s.

Cannabis Advertisement Campaigns

 Medmen's "Forget Stoner" Campaign  (Created by B.J. Carretta)
 Weedmaps' #weedfacts Campaign 
 Baked Bros' "Baked for the Summer" Campaign (Created by Zane Bolen)

See also
Cannabis advertising in Denver
Tobacco advertising
Alcohol advertising

References

Marijuana Advertising: Room to Maneuver (In Oregon, At Least), Harris-Bricken Law
WAC administrative law covering advertising in Washington
WSLCB advertising FAQ
State-by-State Guide to Cannabis Advertising Regulations, Leafly, 2015

Sources

External links

Drug advertising
Cannabis industry